Niall Dermot Andrews (19 August 1937 – 16 October 2006) was an Irish politician. He served as a Teachta Dála (TD) and Member of the European Parliament (MEP) for the Fianna Fáil party.

Andrews was born in Dublin. He was educated at Synge Street CBS and Presentation College, Bray. Andrews came from a very strong republican family. His father, Todd Andrews, served in the War of Independence and the Irish Civil War for the anti-treaty side. Todd Andrews was also a founder-member of Fianna Fáil in 1926. Niall Andrews's mother, Mary Coyle, was a prominent member of Cumann na mBan.

Before entering politics he worked in RTÉ as a Programme Executive. Andrews was first elected to Dáil Éireann at the 1977 general election for the Dublin County South constituency and later for the Dublin South constituency. He held his seat at each subsequent election until he decided not to contest the 1987 general election. He had been elected to the European Parliament in 1984 for the Dublin constituency and decided to concentrate on European politics instead of domestic. He remained an MEP until his retirement in 2004. He was Minister of State at the Department of the Environment with responsibility for Urban Renewal from October to December 1982.

Andrews' brother David Andrews is a former TD and Minister for Foreign Affairs. His son, Chris Andrews is a Sinn Féin TD for Dublin Bay South.  One of Andrews's nephews, Barry Andrews is a Fianna Fáil MEP for Dublin, while another nephew, Ryan Tubridy, is a television and radio presenter with RTÉ.

Niall Andrews died in Dublin on 16 October 2006.

See also
Families in the Oireachtas

References

External links

1937 births
2006 deaths
Niall
Deaths from lung cancer in the Republic of Ireland
Fianna Fáil MEPs
Fianna Fáil TDs
Members of the 21st Dáil
Members of the 22nd Dáil
Members of the 23rd Dáil
Members of the 24th Dáil
MEPs for the Republic of Ireland 1984–1989
MEPs for the Republic of Ireland 1989–1994
MEPs for the Republic of Ireland 1994–1999
MEPs for the Republic of Ireland 1999–2004
People educated at Synge Street CBS
Politicians from County Dublin
RTÉ executives
Ministers of State of the 23rd Dáil
People educated at Presentation College, Bray